<noinclude>

The Deogarh Fort or Devgarh Fort is one of the very old fort situated in Madhya Pradesh, India. It was the capital of a Gond Dynasty and is located in the present day town of Devgarh, at a distance of 42 km from the district headquarter Chhindwara. It sprawls over a hill 650 m (2132.55 ft) in height and spread over a large area. There are many wells, tanks and building which shows that the Gond capital was extended over a large area.

Geography

Deogarh Fort is located in the southern part of Madhya Pradesh, 42 km (26.1 mi) from the district headquarters of Chhindwara.The fort has over 100 rooms and exotic murals on pillars, balconies and the walls.

The Fort stands on a hill 625m (2050.52 ft) high, in the Deogarh village of development block Mohkhed. The fort is in between of a dense forest as well as deep moat.

Iron becomes Gold
There is a place inside the fort called Moti Tanka which remains full of water throughout the year. There is a legend among the people that there is some stone called Stone of Paras inside the Tanka, so when people throw iron into Tanka it becomes gold. But it is not possible to get gold because no one knows the exact depth of Tanka.

History
Deogarh village is primarily known for its rich historical significance. The Deogarh fort is said to be built by cutting large rocky mountains. According to many historians, this fort was considered to be the most safest built and there was even a under-ground passage which connect Devgarh to Nagpur , it was built to provide a safe passage to the King and Queen in any situation of attack.

Reference

Forts in Madhya Pradesh
Chhindwara district